Chợ Chu is the district capital of Định Hóa District, Thái Nguyên Province, Vietnam.

References

Populated places in Thái Nguyên province
District capitals in Vietnam